A myeon (also spelt as myŏn, myon) or township is an administrative unit in South Korea; along with town (urban), a township (rural) is a division of a county and some cities of fewer than 500,000 population. Townships have smaller populations than towns and represent the rural areas of a county or city. Townships are subdivided into villages. The minimum population limit is 6,000.

List of townships in South Korea

See also 
 Administrative divisions of South Korea

References 

Townships